Yabebyry is a town and distrito in the Misiones department of Paraguay.

Sources 
World Gazeteer: Paraguay – World-Gazetteer.com

Populated places in the Misiones Department